Patalganga is a huge industrial area of the Maharashtra Industrial Development Corporation (MIDC) near Karjat and Panvel. It has got its name from the Patalganga River. Nearest town and junction is Karjat. Nearest hospital is Dhirubhai Ambani Hospital.

The Patalganga industrial area, adjacent to the Mohopada village, is one of the 13 chemical industrial areas developed by MIDC. A historical temple of god Raseshwar is situated on the right bank of river Patalganga. The Patalganga Industrial area is under the jurisdiction of Khalapur taluka (about 22 km) and under Dist. Raigad (about 60 km). The area is surrounded by ranges of high mountains.

Location
 The Patalganga Industrial Area is situated on the left bank of river Patalganga, which is 10 km from Mumbai–Pune National Highway 4 and 7 km from the Mumbai–Pune Expressway. It is just 12 km from Mumbai–Goa National Highway 66.
 The nearest railway station is Rasayani/ Apte which is on Konkan Railway, about 3 km from the area.
 The Patalganga Industrial Area is about 75 km from the Domestic Airport in Santacruz & Chhatrapati Shivaji Maharaj International Airport at Andheri.

References

Geography of Maharashtra